A transdermal analgesic or pain relief patch is a medicated adhesive patch used to relieve minor to severe pain. There are three primary types of analgesic patches. First are patches containing counterirritants, which are used to treat mild to moderate pain. Second are patches containing opioids, such as Buprenorphine and Fentanyl, narcotics used to relieve moderate to severe pain. Fentanyl is often used for opioid-tolerant patients. Most obscure of all are patched containing Nitroglycerin, also known as glyceryl trinitrate (GTN), a medication used for heart failure, high blood pressure, anal fissures, painful periods, and to treat and prevent chest pain.

Counterirritant patches

Counterirritant patches contain ingredients such as capsaicin, methyl salicylate, camphor, or menthol, which are thought to mask pain signals by causing other sensations (itching, warmth, or cooling) in the areas they are applied to. In the United States, patches sold under the brand name Salonpas are approved by the Food and Drug Administration under a New Drug Application (NDA) for the treatment of mild to moderate pain caused by soft tissue injury (e.g., strains, sprains), arthritis, or backache. While Salonpas patches may provide some relief, the effects are not strong and the evidence supporting their efficacy is weak.

Other products, including Bengay and Mentholatum, which are not covered by NDA, indicate relief of minor pain. Counterirritant patches are sold over-the-counter and do not require a prescription. Other over-the-counter products marketed for the relief of minor injury or arthritis pain include Absorbine Jr. Pain Relief, Excedrin Cooling Pads, and Icy Hot Patches. 

In Japan, Salonpas, produced by Hisamitsu Pharmaceutical, remains a popular brand. Other manufacturers, including Yutoku Pharmaceutical, SS Pharmaceutical, and Suzuki Nippondo also produce similar over-the-counter patches containing methyl salicylate or glycol salicylate.

In Australia, patches sold under the brand names Eco Pain and Dencorub are approved by the Therapeutic Goods Administration and listed on the Australian Register for Therapeutic Goods (ARTG) as a Class 1 Medical Device. They are approved for sale over-the-counter for the treatment of mild pain caused by soft tissue injury (e.g., strains, sprains), arthritis, or backache.

Fentanyl patches

Fentanyl transdermal patches are sold under the brand name Duragesic or as generic equivalents. Fentanyl is an opioid with rapid onset of pain relief; it is often used to treat breakthrough pain. Fentanyl patches release fentanyl through the skin and may provide pain relief for up to 72 hours.

Several deaths or life-threatening overdoses have been linked to misuse of fentanyl patches. Fentanyl patches are indicated only for patients with moderate to severe chronic pain who have been taking regular narcotic pain medication for more than a week and who are considered opioid-tolerant. Overdose can occur when patients use more patches than prescribed, change the patches too frequently, or expose the patches to extreme heat.

Nitroglycerin

See also

Manufacturers
Alza Corporation
Hisamitsu Pharmaceutical
The Mentholatum Company, Inc.
Novartis
W.F. Young, Inc.

Products
Deep Heat (Heat rub)
Heat rub
IcyHot
Tiger Balm
Eco Pain

References

Analgesics